Offton is a village in Suffolk, England.

References

External links

Parish Magazine on line

Villages in Suffolk
Mid Suffolk District
Civil parishes in Suffolk